Uttar Pradesh State Highway 70 (UP SH 70) passes

Start
State Highway 70 starts at Jalaun SH21

Route
 Jalaun
 Bangra
 Bhinda Marg (State Border)
Route in Openstreetmap

References 

State Highways in Uttar Pradesh
Jalaun district